is a cover album by British singer Janet Kay. Released through Universal Music Japan on 23 May 2012, the album features English-language reggae covers of popular J-pop songs from the 1970s, 1980s, and 1990s.

Track listing

References

External links
 
 

2012 albums
Universal Music Japan albums
Covers albums